Events from the year 2006 in Nepal.

Incumbents
Monarch : King Gyanendra
Prime Minister: Girija Prasad Koirala (starting 25 April)
Chief Justice: Dilip Kumar Poudel

Events
 April 24 - King Gyanendra reinstates the House of Representatives.
 September 23 - A Shree Air Mil Mi-8 helicopter crashes in Ghunsa, Taplejung killing 24 on board including prominent conservationists.  
 November 26 - Prime Minister Girija Prasad Koirala and Maoist Chairman Pushpa Kamal Dahal sign the Comprehensive Peace Accord.

Deaths
 January 23 - Tara Devi, singer
 August 3 - Ali Miyan, folk poet and songwriter
 September 23 - Chandra Gurung and Harka Gurung

See also
 2006 democracy movement in Nepal

References

 
21st century in Nepal
2000s in Nepal
Years of the 21st century in Nepal
Nepal